Tondon is a town in western Guinea.

Tondon may also refer to:

Tondon, a district in North Toraja Regency, Indonesia
Tondon river, or Dondon, another name for Anyuy River (Khabarovsk Krai), Russia
Butadon, also read as Tondon, a pork equivalent to the Japanese beef dish Gyūdon

See also

Tonson (surname)